is a Japanese politician of the Democratic Party of Japan, a member of the House of Councillors in the Diet (national legislature). A native of Hirakata, Osaka and high school graduate, he was elected to the House of Councillors for the first time in 1998.

References

External links 
 Official website in Japanese.

Members of the House of Councillors (Japan)
Living people
1941 births
People from Hirakata
Democratic Party of Japan politicians